Ştefan Caraulan (born 2 February 1989) is a Moldovan footballer who is currently playing for Spicul Chișcăreni. In 2011, he made his debut for Moldova against Venezuela.

References

External links

Profile on divizianationala.com

Profile and statistics on zimbru.md

1989 births
Living people
Place of birth missing (living people)
Association football defenders
Moldovan footballers
Moldova international footballers
FC Rapid Ghidighici players
FC Dacia Chișinău players
FC Zimbru Chișinău players
FC Sfîntul Gheorghe players
FC Academia Chișinău players
FC Speranța Crihana Veche players
FC Šiauliai players
FC Spicul Chișcăreni players
Moldovan Super Liga players
Moldovan expatriate footballers
Expatriate footballers in Lithuania
Moldovan expatriate sportspeople in Lithuania